"Holy Grail" is a song by American rapper Jay-Z from his twelfth studio album Magna Carta Holy Grail. It features vocals from American singer Justin Timberlake and serves as the album's lead single. It was produced by The-Dream, Timbaland, and J-Roc, with additional production from No ID and contains elements of Nirvana's 1991 hit single "Smells Like Teen Spirit". Following the release of the album, the song charted in many regions, entering at number eight and reaching number four on the US Billboard Hot 100, as well as charting at number seven on the UK Singles Chart. "Holy Grail" had sold over 3.4 million copies in the United States as of 2018.

"Holy Grail" won the Grammy Award for Best Rap/Sung Collaboration at the 56th Grammy Awards. In 2014, Billboard placed it at number 25 on their list of Top 100 Hot Rap Songs of all time.

Recording and composition 
"Holy Grail", along with another track from Magna Carta Holy Grail called "Oceans", was recorded in 2011 during the recording sessions for Jay-Z's collaborative album with Kanye West, Watch the Throne. West wanted the two songs to appear on Watch the Throne, but Jay-Z chose to keep them for his upcoming studio album and they were replaced with "No Church in the Wild" and "Made in America". The early version of the instrumental was created in 2011 by The-Dream. When the recording sessions for MCHG started, Timbaland, together with fellow producer J-Roc, rearranged the instrumental to create the final track.

"Holy Grail" is composed in a D minor key, and plays in common time at a tempo of 72 beats per minute. The vocals range from the note of G3 to C6.  Jay-Z lyrically sampled rock group Nirvana's single "Smells Like Teen Spirit" after receiving permission from Courtney Love, who owns the rights to the original song. In an interview with BBC Radio 1, Jay-Z stated that "Holy Grail" was "the map for the album" and that it set the tone for the rest of MCHG. When the song was first recorded for Watch the Throne, Jay-Z thought it would get lost on the album and decided to keep it as the "center piece" for his next album. The song's lyrics can be interpreted as Jay-Z's and Timberlake's love-hate relationship with fame.

Music video 
On August 2, 2013, Jay-Z revealed to Power 106 that he and fellow tour mate Justin Timberlake had begun shooting the music video for "Holy Grail". The music video was directed by Anthony Mandler and was released on August 29, 2013, on Facebook, making social media history as the first time a clip from major artists debuted exclusively on the site. Dubbed a "visual" rather than a "music video", the piece is a remixed version of the original album version, featuring pitch shifted vocals and a change in the song structure. The visual was critically acclaimed for both its imagery, and remixed vocals. It was photographed by cinematographer David Devlin. Kyle Anderson from Entertainment Weekly praised the piece's imagery, describing its nightmarish sequences as "arresting", and complimented the remixed video version of the song as "miles beyond the album version".

Critical reception 
Andy Gill of The Independent described the song as "smooth and mellifluous," while Rolling Stones Simon Vozick called it a "surprisingly moody opener." DJ Booth praised the track as an "appropriately bombastic intro to an epic LP." In Billboard, Adelle Platon noted the song "features Timberlake's vocals in raw, heart-wrenching form as he sings of the pitfalls of fame." Criticizing the song as "laughably overblown", Ian Cohen of Pitchfork Media writes that Timberlake "cycles through every tortured artist cliché short of a crucifixion metaphor." Cohen further stated that the "Smells Like Teen Spirit" interpolation "becomes just another forgettable status symbol" and commented: "Where Kurt Cobain felt compromised by his fame, Jay and Timberlake are doing everything in their power not to offend the money people—whether it's Samsung, Target, or someone dropping $250 to see them at the Rose Bowl."

Chart performance 
The song had a hot-shot debut on many charts upon the release of the album, despite not being released as an official single. It debuted at number eight on the US Billboard Hot 100, being at the time the second highest debut of the year 2013 on that chart. It peaked at number four and remained in the top 10 for 16 weeks. It has sold over 3.4 million copies in the US as of 2018.

After entering at number 24, "Holy Grail" peaked at number seven on the UK Singles Chart.

In 2013, "Holy Grail" was ranked as the 22nd most popular song of the year on the Billboard Hot 100.

Live performances
Justin Timberlake and Jay-Z performed "Holy Grail" together during their co-headlining tour Legends of the Summer. They also performed the song live at the Wireless Festival in London on July 14, 2013. During the concert at Barclays Center as part of Timberlake's The 20/20 Experience World Tour on December 14, 2014, Jay-Z joined him on stage to perform the song.

"Holy Grail" was also performed during the On the Run Tour (2014) and as the opening number on On the Run II Tour (2018), a co-headlining tour by Beyoncé and Jay-Z. During the performance of the song, Beyoncé sang Justin Timberlake's parts. Consequence Alex Young chose the song as one of the particular highlights of the show.

Awards

Charts

Weekly charts

Year-end charts

Certifications

Release history

References 

Jay-Z songs
Justin Timberlake songs
2013 songs
Songs written by Jay-Z
Songs written by Justin Timberlake
Songs written by Timbaland
Songs written by Jerome "J-Roc" Harmon
Song recordings produced by Timbaland
Song recordings produced by The-Dream
Song recordings produced by Jerome "J-Roc" Harmon
Music videos directed by Anthony Mandler
Roc-A-Fella Records singles
Roc Nation singles
Universal Music Group singles
Songs written by Kurt Cobain
Grammy Award for Best Rap/Sung Collaboration
Songs written by No I.D.
Song recordings produced by No I.D.
Songs about fame